The 1st constituency of the Haute-Marne is a French legislative constituency in the Haute-Marne département.

Description

Haute-Marne's 1st constituency covers the southern portion of the department and includes the prefecture of Chaumont.

Despite being won by the left at the 1997 election the seat was comfortably held by Luc Chatel of the UMP from 2002 to 2017.

Historic Representation

Election results

2022 

 
 
|-
| colspan="8" bgcolor="#E9E9E9"|
|-

2017

2012

 
 
 
 
|-
| colspan="8" bgcolor="#E9E9E9"|
|-

References

 Official results of French elections from 2002: "Résultats électoraux officiels en France" (in French).

1